The Atuu show is a Ghanaian television program hosted by Abeiku Santana on United Television (UTV).  It's a chat program on television that features interviews with celebrities and well-known figures in the entertainment sector.

Interviewed 

 Nana Ama mcbrown
 Abraham Attah
 Jocelyn Dumas
Obaapa Christy
 Kuami Eugene
 KiDi
Piesie Esther
 Mzbel
 Rosemond Brown
 Tracy Boakye
 Fred Amugi
 Efia Edo
 Sista Afia
Xandy Kamel
 Ebony Reign
Nii Sika Brown
Okyeame Kwame
 Yvonne Nelson
 Daina Asamoah
 John Boye
 Kwadwo Nkansah
 Afia Schwarzenegger
 Guru
 Emelia Brobbey
 Benedicta Gafah
Kwame A Plus
 Patapaa
 Wanlov the Kubolor
 Nikki Samonas
Doris Sakeitey
 Shatta Wale
 Samini
 maame serwaa
 Ebony Reign
 Wendy shay
 King Promise
 Big Akwes
 Diana Antwi Hamilton
 Archbishop Salifu Amoako
Dope Nation
 Nana Opoku Kwarteng
 Eazzy
 Bukom Banku
Tacha
 Kofi Mole
Bismark The Joke
 Eno Barony
Timothy Bentum
Joyce Blessing
 Omar Sheriff Captan
Vicky Zugah
Adina Thembi
Kelvin Bwoy
StrongManBurner
Biggie Boss Oteele
Kwaku Twumasi
Lord Kenya

References

External links 

 Facebook Page

Ghanaian television shows
Television talk shows
United Television Ghana original programming